Roy Allan Melanson (February 13, 1937 – May 22, 2020) was an American serial killer and rapist, conclusively linked to three murders and numerous rapes in three states, and remains the prime suspect in at least two other murders. Melanson was convicted of two 1974 murders, for which he received two life sentences, and died in May 2020 at the Colorado Territorial Correctional Facility, in Cañon City, Colorado.

Early life and crimes
Hailing from Breaux Bridge, Louisiana, Melanson was a drifter and con artist who spent a majority of his life in various prisons. Some of his earliest offenses include burglaries and rapes in Orange and Jefferson County, Texas, for the latter of which he was given 12 years imprisonment, but served only half of it. He allegedly killed an inmate while imprisoned in Texas. In 1975, he was extradited for a rape trial, which landed him a life sentence. However, it was reduced, and he was released in March 1988, a few months before the murder of one suspected victim.

Murders

Anita Andrews
A one-time county fair beauty queen, 51-year-old Anita Andrews was a single mother working two jobs, one at the Napa State Hospital and the other being at the family bar named "Fagiani's Cocktail Lounge", inherited by both Andrews and her sister Muriel from their father. She was last seen alive on July 10, 1974, tending to the bar, which was near closing hours, as one stranger was still hanging around the premises.

The following morning, Muriel found her sister's body in a pool of blood on the floor. Anita Andrews had been raped, her clothes ripped through, stabbed 13 times with a screwdriver, in addition to having her throat slashed. Her Cadillac Eldorado was also missing. The killer had left several clues behind—a cigarette butt in an ashtray, a partial bloody fingerprint on a rear staircase, fingerprints on a bottle and an open cash register. Despite this, it would take decades for her case to be resolved.

Michele Wallace
In August 1974, Melanson arrived in Gunnison County, Colorado, presenting himself as an experienced sheepherder. One rancher from the area even hired him to hunt down mountain lions and coyotes who were killing his flock. One afternoon, while in the "Timbers Bar" in Gunnison, Colorado, Melanson got acquainted with local ranch hand Charles Matthews, asking for a ride. However, Matthews' car broke down while on the road, just as Michele Wallace (referred to in some sources as 'Michele French'), who was returning from a backpacking trip, drove by. She offered both men a ride, and after dropping off Matthews back at the bar, she and Melanson continued on. From that moment, nobody saw her alive ever again.

Wallace's disappearance became a cold case, and remained as such until one county sheriff decided to re-open it in the early 1990s. Not long after, Wallace's remains were found off a remote mountain road, but it could not be determined how exactly she had died.

Pauline Klumpp
A suspected victim of Melanson, the 51-year-old Pauline Klumpp was renting a home to Melanson, his ex-wife and her new boyfriend in the Port Acres area of Port Arthur, Texas. One day in 1988, she asked Melanson for help with her air conditioner, as well as to pick up a TV from the trio. The two were last seen together, but Klumpp mysteriously vanished after that. Klumpp's then-husband, who was staying in a motel for his out-of-town job in Galveston, regularly traveled to ensure that Klumpp was alright. After returning home, he found a pot of gumbo on the stove, which apparently had been cooking for days. Four days after her disappearance, her car was found behind a grocery store, with the TV still inside.

Det. Scott Gaspard, who is in charge of solving Klumpp's cold case, has said that Melanson had been the prime suspect since the very beginning. Since they had no luck with finding the body, authorities reluctantly accepted assistance from a Louisiana psychic named Karen Jannise. Jannise, who had previously aided with locating remains in Mississippi and Canada, described the scenery in an astonishingly accurate manner, including details only police officials knew about. According to her, Klumpp's killer likely decapitated her, and then tossed the head in a grassy area. She also added that he was "very dangerous, evil", and that he had killed far more women than the detectives knew about.

Charlotte Sauerwin
About a month later, Melanson found himself in Walker, Louisiana, a small town east of Baton Rouge. While hanging around a laundromat, on August 5, 1988, he overheard 24-year-old Charlotte Sauerwin gossiping about how long it was taking for her fiancé, Vincent LeJeune, to save money so they could buy land for a home. In that moment, Melanson stepped in, presenting himself as a land developer with a sensible offer, for not much money. When the other people left the laundromat, Melanson attacked her, viciously raping and torturing Sauerwin, before eventually strangling and cutting her throat. He then tied a strap around her neck, dragging the body near a shed, where he dumped it.

Trial and imprisonment
Melanson was arrested in January 1992, after Michele Wallace's remains were located in Colorado. Melanson was found to be in possession of her car and other items, including her camera, which showed him posing with a yet-unidentified teenager. He was brought to trial, convicted and sentenced to life imprisonment for her murder, based on hair evidence collected from her scalp. It was not until 2000, when a newly enacted federal law obliged him to submit his DNA for testing, when authorities got a chance to solve the other murders.

DNA evidence connected him to both Andrews and Sauerwin's murders in 2010, but he was only tried for the former's in 2011, receiving another life imprisonment term. Since then, law enforcement agencies around the country started reviewing their cold cases, with the hope that they could connect Melanson to any further crimes. Melanson has thus far been uncooperative with police, and has repeatedly tried to apply for parole before the Colorado Supreme Court, without success.

Melanson died on May 22, 2020 while serving his sentence. His death was not announced until 2021 when the Napa District Attorney's Office called the prison to check on him.

See also 
 List of serial killers in the United States

Bibliography

External links
 People v. Melanson
 Documentary

References

1937 births
2020 deaths
20th-century American criminals
American male criminals
American people convicted of murder
American people convicted of rape
American people who died in prison custody
American rapists
American serial killers
Criminals of the San Francisco Bay Area
Male serial killers
People convicted of murder by California
People convicted of murder by Colorado
People from Breaux Bridge, Louisiana
Prisoners sentenced to life imprisonment by California
Prisoners sentenced to life imprisonment by Colorado
Prisoners who died in Colorado detention
Serial killers who died in prison custody